Lucius Cocceius Auctus (1st century BC and 1st century AD) was a Roman architect employed by Octavian's strategist (and intended successor) Agrippa to excavate the subterranean passageways known as the crypta neapolitana connecting modern-day Naples and Pozzuoli and the Grotta di Cocceio, connecting Lake Avernus and Cumae. Cocceius was responsible for the conversion of the Capitolium in Pozzuoli into a Temple of Augustus with the backing of the merchant Lucius Calpurnius. Cocceius Auctus also built the original Pantheon in Rome.

Further reading
Adam, Jean-Pierre. La construction romaine (3rd edition), Picard, Paris (France), 1984; pp. 306–307.
Lamprecht, Heinz-Otto.  Opus Caementitium (4th edition), Beton-Verlag, Düsseldorf (Germany), 1993; pp. 229.

See also
 Cocceia gens

References

1st-century BC births
1st-century deaths
1st-century BC Romans
1st-century Romans
Ancient Roman architects
Auctus, Lucius
1st-century BC architects